The Randolph County Courthouse is located at the southwest corner of Broadway and North Marr Street in downtown Pocahontas, the county seat of Randolph County, Arkansas. It is a two-story brick and concrete Art Deco building, designed by Eugene John Stern and built in 1940 with funding from the Works Progress Administration.  The primary construction material is buff-colored brick, but its raised central section is faced in gray concrete, which is also used in banding around the sides of the building.  The central section has an arcade created by four tall fluted square pillars with capitals reminiscent of Corinthian design.  The building replaced the old courthouse, an 1870s Italianate building that now houses other civic offices.

The building was listed on the National Register of Historic Places in 1996.

See also
Old Randolph County Courthouse, also NRHP-listed, also in Pocohontas, built in the 1870s

References

Courthouses on the National Register of Historic Places in Arkansas
Government buildings completed in 1940
Art Deco architecture in Arkansas
Buildings and structures in Randolph County, Arkansas
County courthouses in Arkansas
National Register of Historic Places in Randolph County, Arkansas
Historic district contributing properties in Arkansas